Propp is a surname. Notable people with the surname include:

Brian Propp (born 1959), Canadian ice hockey player
Rodney Propp (born 1965), American real estate developer
William Propp (born 1957), American historian of the Bible
Vladimir Propp (1895–1970), Soviet scholar